Scopula serratilinea is a moth of the  family Geometridae. It is found in Peru.

References

Moths described in 1907
serratilinea
Moths of South America